Bilciurești is a commune in Dâmbovița County, Muntenia, Romania. It is composed of two villages, Bilciurești and Suseni-Socetu.

Natives
 Alexandru Badea

References

Communes in Dâmbovița County
Localities in Muntenia